Apadana may refer to:
 Apadana, a large hypostyle hall at Persepolis and the palace of Susa
 Apadāna, a collection of biographical stories found in the Khuddaka Nikaya of the Pāli Canon, the scriptures of Theravada Buddhism
 Apadana Complex, a large residential complex in western part of Tehran, Iran
 Apadana Stadium, a multi-purpose stadium in Tehran, Iran